American Samoa competed at the 1996 Summer Olympics in Atlanta, United States.

Athletics 

Men
Field events

Women
Field events

Boxing

Men

Sailing

Open

Weightlifting

Men

Wrestling

Cuba has qualified quota places in the following events

Men's freestyle

References

Official Olympic Reports

Nations at the 1996 Summer Olympics
1996
1996 in American Samoan sports